Malaysia competed at the 2019 World Aquatics Championships in Gwangju, South Korea from 12 to 28 July.

Medalists

Diving

Malaysia entered nine divers.

Men

Women

Mixed

Swimming

Malaysia entered five swimmers.

Men

Women

Mixed

References

Nations at the 2019 World Aquatics Championships
Malaysia at the World Aquatics Championships
2019 in Malaysian sport